Daniela Mehlhaff (born September 1, 1996) is a German female acrobatic gymnast. With partners Janina Hiller and Selina Frey-Sander, Mehlhaff competed in the 2014 Acrobatic Gymnastics World Championships.

References

1996 births
Living people
German acrobatic gymnasts
Female acrobatic gymnasts